The Everglades is an American crime-adventure television series that aired in syndication for one season from 1961–62 and in reruns. Ron Hayes starred as Constable Lincoln Vail, a law enforcement officer of the fictional Everglades County Patrol who traveled the Florida Everglades in an airboat, a vehicle which was often the focus of the program. Hayes, a northern California actor and stuntman, was an avid outdoorsman and conservationist.

Gordon Casell appeared in five of the 38 half-hour episodes as Chief Anderson, Vail's superior. Steve Brodie made three appearances as Captain Andy Benson; Dan Chandler was twice cast as Vail's sidekick, airboat guide Pete Hammond. Future film star Burt Reynolds appeared twice in the role of Lew Johnson and once as Trask.

Guest stars included R.G. Armstrong, Victor Buono, Roger C. Carmel, Paul Carr, Jack Cassidy, Lonny Chapman, John Doucette, Penny Edwards, Frank Ferguson, Luke Halpin, Douglas Kennedy, Robert Knapp, Paul Lambert, Tyler McVey, Larry Pennell, Mala Powers, Chris Robinson, Johnny Seven, Ray Teal, Bill Travers and Dawn Wells.

Background
The original script for the series, "Son of the Everglades", was written by model and actor Albert Wilmore of Ft. Lauderdale, Florida, who spent his free time sailing and fishing in Whitewater Bay, before the Everglades became a national park.  Wilmore was fascinated by the myriad birds, wildlife and mangrove estuaries in the shallow waters, and the native Seminoles. His son Scott recalled that Wilmore decided to meld a wildlands backdrop and use native Seminoles, with a park ranger, and high-speed airboats.  Wilmore pitched the story to a number of production companies in Miami and Hollywood, Florida.

After Wilmore's wife Edith died, Scott discovered a deed for an acre of land within Everglades National Park. Scott explained that the deed was a gift from the Seminoles, acknowledging Albert's efforts for their inclusion in the production.  Originally, the director wanted to use white actors in reddish makeup instead.

Scott Wilmore later sold the land, under threat of eminent domain, to the National Park Service for $300.

Episodes

Production
South Florida shooting locations included Everglades National Park, Andytown, Coopertown, Frog City, Sweetwater and Forty Mile Bend along the Tamiami Trail.

The original plan was to use white actors as Seminoles with makeup and studio-produced costumes, but native Seminoles, wearing their traditional dress, were used.  They were pleased to have the comparatively easy work as both extras and, because of their expertise and mechanical abilities, to operate and maintain the airboats. They had little prior employment opportunities living within the Everglades, other than beading, giving airboat rides and wrestling with alligators for the tourist trade. Few were given speaking parts and nearly all of them were denied entry into the Screen Actors Guild (SAG), the actors union.

Because the show was on a tight budget (an episode was completed every two-and-a-half days), Chandler was given little training on airboats, so there were a few unintentional "flybys" and at least one crash, leaving the actor swinging from an overhanging tree. Hays, however, became an accomplished air boat driver and formed close bonds with the Seminoles who supplied and maintained them.

During 1961, Tors was filming the first of his two Flipper feature films in Miami and the Florida Keys; Dan Chandler was signed for a recurring role in his Flipper TV series, and for a part in the 1964 movie sequel, Flipper's New Adventure.

Notes

References
 
 .

1961 American television series debuts
1962 American television series endings
1960s American crime drama television series
First-run syndicated television programs in the United States
Television shows set in Florida
Television shows filmed in Florida
English-language television shows
Television series by MGM Television
Everglades
American adventure television series